Virus Nine was an American punk rock band from Southern, Oregon, United States.  Established in 1995 and disbanded in 2012, after playing their final show in memory of Josh "J-Train" Guillory (founding member and lifelong friend of vocalist Mike Estes).

Former members
 Guitar: Josh Guillory (deceased)
 Vocals: Mike Estes
 Drums: Ryan Dingee
 Bass: Tim Capehart
 Guitar: Daniel Peel
 Guitar: Daniel Benne
 Guitar: Mike Bertrand
 Guitar: Silas Shand
 Bass: Caleb Guillory (deceased)
 Bass: Danny Cantwell
 Drums: Aaron Benson

Discography
 "51' at Enewetak" (1998 7" Vinyl) Mental Records
 What Are You Afraid Of? (2002 CD) A-F Records
 Blastin' Away (2003 CD) A-F Records (Produced by Duane Peters)
 Virus Nine / Hudson Falcons Split (2007 7" Vinyl) City Rat Records (German Import)

References

External links
 Official site
 Official Facebook page
 AF Records

Punk rock groups from Oregon
A-F Records artists